Ioannis Kougialis (born 19 September 1957) is a Cypriot judoka. He competed in the men's half-middleweight event at the 1984 Summer Olympics.

References

1957 births
Living people
Cypriot male judoka
Olympic judoka of Cyprus
Judoka at the 1984 Summer Olympics
Place of birth missing (living people)